Yu Xinqing (1898-4 September 1966) was a Chinese clergy and politician.

Born into a family of local government officials in Hefei, Anhui, Yu graduated from Nanking Theological Seminary as well as Columbia University. In his early years, he was a chaplain in Christian General Feng Yuxiang's army, fought north and south. He had been hailed as "Red Priest". Yu began his revolutionary career since 1933, he was once in exile in Japan, and he was once arrested and jailed. After the founding of the Communist State, he served in various posts in the Communist government. In 1966, the Cultural Revolution broken out, Yu committed suicide during a series of humiliation.

Biography

Early life and education
Yu was born in Hefei, Anhui, in 1898, to a powerful family. His grandfather was a general in the Huai Army. He had twelve siblings. Because of war and poverty, only he and three other siblings survived. In the autumn of 1915, Yu was accepted to the newly created Nanking Theological Seminary and graduated in 1919.

Pastor career
After graduation, he became a minister and pastor a church in Jiangxi. In the summer of 1922, the Henan YMCA hosted a summer camp in the capital city Kaifeng, they invited celebrities to give lectures. Yu made a stirring speech that attracted the Christian General Feng Yuxiang's attention. He was hired as Feng's chaplain. In the autumn of 1924, he pursued advanced studies at Columbia University in the United States.

Revolutionary career
When he returned to China he became president of Xunzheng College in Kaifeng, Henan and then president of Mingyi Meddle School in Linfen, Shanxi, and later became director of the general affairs department of the Counter-Japanese Allies, serving as secretary-general of the warlord Feng Yuxiang.

In 1933, he took part in the Fujian Incident, served as acting president of the Economic Committee of the People's Revolutionary Government. Chiang Kai-shek, the Generalissimo of the Republic of China, personally led his troops to crush the rebellion. The People's Revolutionary Government was routed and Yu went into exile in Japan.

In the summer of 1935, he returned to China and worked in the United Front of the Communist Party of China under the leadership of Zhou Enlai. After the fall of Shandong province, Yu served as a member of the Standing Committee of the Disaster Relief Committee of the Executive Yuan in Chongqing. He joined the China Democratic League in 1944. On September 26, 1947, he was arrested by the Nationalist government for participating the anti-government protesters in Beijing. Yu's wife, Liu Lanhua, an alumna of Yenching University, asked the former president John Leighton Stuart for help. John Leighton Stuart said to Chiang Kai-shek:"This man can not kill, he isn't a member of the Communist Party, you killed him will cause many people's discontent." He was released in 1949. He had a brief stay in Hong Kong and then head for Beijing. At the Same year, he attended the First Plenary Session of the Chinese People's Political Consultative Conference (CPPCC).

PRC era
After the establishment of the Communist State, he served as deputy director of the Office of the Central People's Government, deputy secretary-general of the National People's Congress, deputy director of the State Ethnic Affairs Commission, member of the Standing Committee of the China Democratic League, and vice-chairman of the Beijing Municipal Committee of the Chinese People's Political Consultative Conference. During his time as director of Dianli Bureau, he was responsible for the founding ceremony of the etiquette arrangements.

Cultural Revolution
In 1966, Mao Zedong launched the Cultural Revolution, Yu wrote a letter to Prime Minister Zhou Enlai, he expressed doubts about the socialist mass movement. But soon Yu was denounced as a "monsters and freaks" (literally: evil people) by the Communist government. Like thousands of other intellectuals in China, he experienced mistreatment and suffered political persecution. The Red Guards paraded him through the streets and beat him in public. On September 4, 1966, Yu hanged himself because of unbearable psychological pressures. "Mr. Yu is a senior intellectural who follows our Party, he is uprightness and tenacity as well as honest and upright, 'a scholar prefers death to humiliation', how could he have had that kind of insult? If I was in Beijing, I will enlighten him, perhaps he will not go that way." said Xi Zhongxun who had worked closely with him for years.

Personal life
Yu married Liu Lanhua in 1927, after they met in Columbia University. The couple had a daughter, Yu Huaxin, who was married to Feng Hongda, son of Feng Yuxiang and a rear admiral (shaojiang) in the People's Liberation Army Navy (PLAN) and deputy commander of the North Sea Fleet.

Work

References

External links

1898 births
1966 deaths
Politicians from Hefei
Chinese clergy
Columbia University alumni
People's Republic of China politicians from Anhui
Republic of China politicians from Anhui
Victims of the Cultural Revolution
Chinese politicians who committed suicide